Korhan Erel (1973, Istanbul) is a musician, improviser, sound designer based in Berlin.

Korhan plays instruments they design on a computer or other electronic instruments by employing various controllers. They are a founding member of Islak Köpek, Turkey's pioneer free improvisation group, which is regarded as the band that started the free improvisation scene in Turkey. They compose and design sounds for dance, theater, installations and film, and collaborate with dancers, video artists, and spoken word artists.

Early life 
Korhan Erel was born on 26 August 1973 to Şaziye Erel and Recep Celil Erel. At the time, Şaziye Erel was working in the Turkish Customs as a clerk, while Recep Celil was working in Anadolu Sigorta. Şaziye Erel's first memory of Korhan's deep interest in sounds was when Korhan as a toddler would make her take them to a bathroom (either their own or their host's bathroom) and there she would have to flush the toilet numerous times while Korhan listened to the flushing of the water and the refilling of the reservoir. If she stopped before Korhan had heard enough, Korhan would cry and she'd have to continue, during a serious financial crisis in mid-70s Turkey where even water was rationed and sparse.

After elementary school, Korhan studied secondary and high school at Robert College, an American-Turkish secondary education institution in Istanbul, from 1985 until 1991. During this period, they had their first computer, a Commodore 64, in the summer of 1985. After a year of only playing computer games, Korhan realized the incredible sounds the computer was able to produce, and started to learn coding. With the Commodore 64, they was not able to go a great distance, but the Commodore Amiga they bought in 1989 changed things forever with its sample playback capability.

Selected Projects

David Rothenberg and Korhan Erel – Berlin Bülbül 
David Rothenberg met Erel during their one-year residency in Berlin. Berlin is one of the most important cities in Europe for nightingales, which is one of the key routes of immigration from Africa through Europe in the spring. David Rothenberg and Erel started to improvise with nightingales in Berlin's parks at midnight. The first concert held on 9 May 2014 and this concert's recordings were used for the album Berlin Bülbül in 2015. The album launch concerts took place in Borusan Music House (Istanbul) on 3 April 2015 and in Sammlung Hoffman (Berlin) on 10 May 2015.

Since 2014, Rothenberg and Erel have been playing with nightingales every May in Berlin.

The Liz 
The Liz is a power trio comprising Liz Allbee (amplified trumpet, voice, text, video, stage design), Liz Kosack (synthesizer, voice, masks, puppets) and Korhan Liz Erel (computer, electronics, sound design, voice). The project is the story of transformations and multiples: a maiden Sphinx, Anubis the dog of death, and Oedipus, as narrated by Kathy Acker. Drawing from traditional Greek myth, as well as Jean Cocteau's 'Infernal Machine' and Acker's 'Blood and Guts in High School', The Liz translates the riddles of the Sphinx into an engine for the musical re-production of resistance, and of subliminal and mythic resonance.

The Liz premiered "Book of Birds" at Quiet Cue on 30 April 2016. It is also performed at Moers Festival in 2016 summer and broadcast live via Arte television channel online.

A Christmas Cage: tribute to John Cage 
Korhan Erel and Tanya Kalmanovitch organized a concert in remembrance of John Cage in his 100th birth year in 2012. The tribute concert included performances of pieces from Cage's Songbooks by Tanya Kalmanovitch, Anthony Coleman, Serra Yılmaz, Tolga Tüzün, Ayşenur Kolivar, Gökçe Akçelik, Şevket Akıncı and Korhan Erel on 29 December 2012 at Borusan Music House.

Albums

References 

Turkish musicians
Living people
1973 births